Bass Pro Shops: Trophy Hunter 2007 is a hunting game developed by Canadian studio Jarhead Games and released for the Xbox and PC on November 20, 2006.

Animals
 Whitetail deer
 Grizzly bear
 Polar bear
 Musk ox

Reception

Official Xbox Magazine gave the game 4.0 out of 10 saying "Even if hunting is about communing with nature, Trophy Hunter reduces it to boredom"

References

2006 video games
Hunting video games
Windows games
Xbox games
Video games developed in Canada
Jarhead Games games